Pterostylis clivicola is a plant in the orchid family Orchidaceae and is endemic to a small area near the border between New South Wales and Victoria. It has a rosette of leaves and up to fourteen green flowers which have a labellum with a dark green, beak-like appendage.

Description
Pterostylis clivicola, is a terrestrial,  perennial, deciduous, herb with an underground tuber. The dorsal sepal and petals form a hood or "galea" over the column. The dorsal sepal is pointed, erect near its base then curves forward. Flowering occurs from October to December.

Taxonomy and naming
This greenhood was first formally described in 2008 by David Jones and given the name Hymenochilus clivicola. The description was published in The Orchadian from a specimen collected near Delegate. In 2010, Gary Backhouse changed the name to Pterostylis clivicola. The specific epithet (clivicola) is derived from the Latin word clivus meaning "ascent", "elevation", "hill" or "sloping hillside" with the suffix -cola meaning "dweller".

Distribution and habitat
Pterostylis clivicola is only known from a population of about twenty plants growing in grassland near Bendoc.

References

clivicola
Endemic orchids of Australia
Orchids of New South Wales
Orchids of Victoria (Australia)
Plants described in 2008